Thomas Joseph Taylor (born September 14, 1962) is a former American football  guard for the Los Angeles Rams in the National Football League. He played collegiately at Georgia Tech.

External links
NFL.com player page

1962 births
Living people
Sportspeople from Los Angeles County, California
Players of American football from California
American football offensive guards
Georgia Tech Yellow Jackets football players
Los Angeles Rams players
People from Acton, California
National Football League replacement players